Lemmens is a Dutch patronymic surname derived from "Lambert's son". The name is particularly popular in Belgian Limburg where it is the ninth most common last name. Notable people with the surname include:

 Alfons Lemmens (1919–2013), Dutch footballer
 An Lemmens (born 1980), Belgian presenter
 Erwin Lemmens (born 1976), Belgian professional soccer player
 Gertrude Lemmens (1914–2000), Dutch Roman Catholic sister and missionary
 Helen Lemmens (1834–1906), English soprano, wife of Jacques-Nicolas Lemmens
 Jacques-Nicolas Lemmens (1823–1881), Flemish composer and organist
 Jean-Nicolas Lemmens (1850–1897), Dutch Catholic priest and Canadian bishop
 Leon Lemmens (1954–2017), Belgian Roman Catholic auxiliary bishop
 Salesius Lemmens  (1904–1942), Dutch Apostolic Prefect of the Order of Friars Minor
 Sean Lemmens (born 1994), Australian rules footballer
 Stacy Lemmens (1998–2006), Belgian murder victim
 Steve Lemmens (1972–2016), Belgian snooker player

Lemmen:
 Celina Lemmen (born 1985), Dutch swimmer
 Georges Lemmen (1865–1916), Belgian neo-impressionist painter

See also
 Lemmens Institute or Lemmensinstituut, a Belgian conservatory in Leuven
 Leroy Lamis (1925–2010), American sculptor whose family name originally was Lemmens

References

External links

Dutch-language surnames
Patronymic surnames